Brand Peru is an initiative of the Ministry of Foreign Trade and Tourism of Peru in partnership with Peruvian companies and startups to promote the purchase and consumption of products created in Peru. It also seeks to boost tourism, exports and attract investment using branding and neuromarketing.

Brand Peru leads among the corporate identities of Latin America, thanks to the efforts of Peruvian companies to maintain the multicultural identity of the country. Therefore, even Peruvian startups and foreign companies can request a license to use the Peru Brand in advertisements or products. According to the tourism edition of the 'Country Brand Ranking' report carried out by Bloom Consulting, Peru Brand climbed 11 positions in the ranking compared to the 2014 - 2015 report; placing Peru in the position 41 of the global list of the report corresponding to the period 2017 - 2018.

History 
Since 2002, PromPeru (Commission for the Promotion of Peru for Exports and Tourism) has used different means and tools to boost tourism and investment in Peru. In 2011, together with the Ministry of Foreign Trade and Tourism, they created Peru Brand in association with various Peruvian companies and startups that collaborate with each other in order to improve Peru's image in the world.

On March 10, 2011, the launch of the new Peru Brand was announced, and it was presented to the world during the ITB fair in Berlin, and the New York Stock Exchange.

Since then more than 200 companies have requested PromPerú the license for the use of Peru Brand, which is free from its website. Among the areas where this brand is most used is tourism, agriculture, textiles and hotels.

Under the philosophy of making Peru known to the world, Peru Brand performs and participates in different events every year. Up to now, the campaigns of Peru Brand have had a reach of 2.491 million people worldwide, results that are they are reflected in the best positions the country has reached in different rankings. According to the Country RepTrak (a study that measures the reputation of countries), Peru is the third Latin American country with the best reputation in the industrialized countries environment, residing its strengths in the kindness of its people and its natural environment.

Companies 
Companies that use Peru Brand:

 Inca Kola
 D'Onofrio
 Primax
 Topitop
 Agroindustrias del Sur
 Pioneer Corporation
 ADUNI
 Cementos Lima
 LAN Airlines
 Hoteles Casa Andina
 Industria Textil Nuevo Mundo
 Latina Televisión
 Agronegocios Wanka
 Agroindustrias Integradas
 Agroindustrias Santa María
 BBVA
 Sazón Lopesa
 Grupo Gloria
 Café Britt
 Bembos
 Saco Oliveros School
 Filtros Lys
 Parque Arauco
 Turismo CIVA
 Baterías Etna
 Saga Falabella
 Frenosa
 Y&R
 Molitalia
 Ripley
 Ajeper
 Altomayo
 Peruvian Airlines
 National University of San Marcos
 Induquímica
 Austral
 Productos Unión
 Hotel Westin
 Innovadent
 Editora El Óvalo
 Camposol
 Corporación Panaservice
 Cerveza Cristal
 Danper Trujillo
 Consorcio Turístico Norte
 Nabisco
 Crecemás Peru Digital
 Huankarute
 Alicorp
 Fuller Academy

References 

Economy of Peru